Lund's node, or Mascagni's lymph node (often erroneously referred to as Calot's node), is the sentinel lymph node of the gall bladder. It increases in size in cholecystitis and cholangitis. It is an anatomic landmark and is removed along with the gall bladder in cholecystectomy. It is situated within the Triangle of Calot, where abides the space below the cystic artery.

The node is named after Fred Bates Lund (1865-1950), an American surgeon. It was also named after the Italian anatomist and physician, Paolo Mascagni (1752-1815), who first identified the node around 1787.

Lymphatics of the torso
Anatomic Landmarks

References